Lovre Čirjak (born 2 November 1991) is a Croatian football player who plays for Hrvatski Vitez as a winger.

Club career
He made his Croatian First Football League debut for Zadar on 21 July 2014 in a game against RNK Split.

References

External links
 

1991 births
Living people
Sportspeople from Zadar
Association football wingers
Croatian footballers
NK Novalja players
HNK Primorac Biograd na Moru players
KF Shkëndija players
NK Zadar players
NK Celje players
NK Inter Zaprešić players
FC Nizhny Novgorod (2015) players
NK Krško players
FC Koper players
Hapoel Afula F.C. players
NK Hrvatski Dragovoljac players
Macedonian First Football League players
Croatian Football League players
Russian First League players
First Football League (Croatia) players
Slovenian PrvaLiga players
Slovenian Second League players
Liga Leumit players
Croatian expatriate footballers
Expatriate footballers in North Macedonia
Expatriate footballers in Slovenia
Expatriate footballers in Russia
Expatriate footballers in Israel
Croatian expatriate sportspeople in North Macedonia
Croatian expatriate sportspeople in Slovenia
Croatian expatriate sportspeople in Russia
Croatian expatriate sportspeople in Israel